The Animal Defense League (ADL) is an internationally active grassroots animal rights organization, fighting to end animal exploitation and abuse. Working under the same banner, the coalition of activists and supporters that make up the various ADL chapters are able to have a stronger effect in their campaigns and fight together towards the collective goal of animal liberation.

Known chapters 
USA
Chicago
Boston
Long Island
Salt Lake City
Los Angeles
Evansville, Indiana
Portland, Oregon
Washington, D.C.
New Jersey
Philadelphia
North Carolina
Arizona

Canada
Ottawa
Vancouver

See also
List of animal rights groups

References

External links 
Arizona ADL

Animal rights organizations